The 1st Minnesota Infantry Regiment was the very first group of volunteers the Union received in response to the South's assault of Fort Sumter at the beginning of the United States Civil War. Minnesota's Governor Alexander Ramsey offered 1000 men to Lincoln immediately upon learning of the attack on the fort. He just happened to be in Washington when the news broke. Those men volunteered for a five-year commitment (1861–64) which was much longer than other states. During combat actions, the 1st Minnesota sustained substantial casualties at the battles of First Bull Run (20%) and Antietam (28%) and a staggering 82% at the Battle of Gettysburg, where the regiment's most famous actions occurred on the second day of the battle.

At a dire moment on the afternoon of July 2, 1863, Major General Winfield Scott Hancock, commander of II Corps, ordered the 1st Minnesota to charge into a brigade of roughly 1200 men of James Longstreet's corps and Richard H. Anderson's Division, which it did with roughly 250 men. They were outnumbered by at least 5 to 1, but it was Gen. Hancock's only option to buy time for reinforcements to arrive. One survivor stated afterward that he expected the advance to result in "death or wounds to us all". The regiment immediately obeyed the order and Gen. Hancock was amazed at the unit discipline, valor, and the tremendous casualties taken in carrying out his order. This action blunted the Confederate attack and helped preserve the Union's precarious position on Cemetery Ridge at the end of the second day of the battle.

Post war, both General Hancock and U.S. President Calvin Coolidge were unrestrained in their praise for the actions of the 1st Minnesota. Gen. Hancock, who witnessed the action firsthand, placed its heroism highest in the annals of war: "No soldiers on any field, in this or any other country ever displayed grander heroism". Gen. Hancock ascribed unsurpassed gallantry to the famed assault stating: "There is no more gallant deed recorded in history". Emphasizing the critical nature of the circumstances on July 2 at Gettysburg, President Coolidge considered: "Colonel Colvill and those eight companies of the First Minnesota are entitled to rank as the saviors of their country".

History

Organization and early service

On April 14, 1861, Minnesota Governor Alexander Ramsey was visiting Washington DC. Upon hearing of the attack on Fort Sumter Governor Ramsey immediately offered President Lincoln 1000 men to fight the South. Word of the Governor's offer spread and communities back in Minnesota quickly raised groups of volunteers in support of Ramsey.  The abandoned Fort Snelling, at the confluence of the Mississippi and Minnesota rivers, was reactivated. The men raised by the communities were sent there and mustered into the 1st Minnesota Infantry Regiment on April 29.  They were the first troops offered by any state to meet Abraham Lincoln's call for 75,000 men to assist the Federal Government  deal with the secession. On May 10 they were remustered "officially" for three years service. From Fort Snelling they boarded river boats to go South to a rail line so they could head east.

Josias Redgate King of the St. Paul Pioneer Guard is credited as the first northern volunteer to stand to for Lincoln's call for men to fight the south.

First Bull Run

On July 21, 1861, near Manassas, Virginia, the regiment fought in the first major battle of the Civil War: the First Battle of Bull Run. While straddling Rickett's Battery in support, it saw heavy fighting on Henry House Hill in close proximity to the enemy. The 1st Minnesota was one of the last regiments to leave the battlefield and suffered among the highest casualties of any northern regiment: 49 killed, 107 wounded and 34 missing.

During the 1st Minnesota Infantry's initiation to combat, its honorable conduct was readily distinguishable from that of the other regiments in its brigade:

The First Minnesota Regiment moved from its position on the left of the field to the support of Ricketts' battery, and gallantly engaged the enemy at that point. It was so near the enemy's lines that friends and foes were for a time confounded. The regiment behaved exceedingly well, and finally retired from the field in good order. The other two regiments of the brigade retired in confusion, and no efforts of myself or staff were successful in rallying them. I respectfully refer you to Colonel Gorman's report for the account of his regiment's behavior and of the good conduct of his officers and men.

Antietam
During General John Sedgwick's ill-fated assault on the West Woods, the regiment suffered significant casualties (1 officer killed, 3 officers wounded, 15 enlisted killed, 79 enlisted wounded, 24 enlisted missing, for a total of 122 [28%] of 435 engaged) as Union forces were routed on that part of the field.  The brigade commander noted, "The First Minnesota Regiment fired with so much coolness and accuracy that they brought down [three times one] of the enemy's flags, and finally cut the flag-staff in two."

Gettysburg

July 2

July 2, 1863 is the day the 1st Minnesota is most remembered for. During the second day's fighting at Gettysburg, the regiment stopped the Confederates from splitting the Union line, pushing the Union off of Cemetery Ridge and overrunning the battery there that could have been then turned on the North.  The actions of the 1st Minnesota saved the battle.

Maj. Gen. Winfield S. Hancock, commander of II Corps, could see two brigades of Southerners commanded by Brig. Gen. Cadmus M. Wilcox breaching the line in front of one of his batteries. He quickly rode up to the troops guarding the battery and asked Col. William Colvill "what unit is this?" Col. Colvill responded "the 1st Minnesota". Gen. Hancock responded "attack that line". With their bayonets leveled, the Minnesotans broke the first lines. The intensity of their charge disrupted the southern advance. With the unit nearly encircled, support arrived in time to allow them to make a fighting withdrawal. Their selfless charge bought the Union the time needed for reinforcements to be brought up. During the charge, 215 of the 262 who made the charge became casualties within five minutes. That included the unit commander, Col. William Colvill, and all but three of his captains.

The 1st Minnesota's flag lost five flag bearers, each man dropping his weapon to carry it on. The 47 survivors rallied back to General Hancock under the command of their senior surviving officer, Captain Nathan S. Messick. The 82% casualty rate stands as the largest loss by any surviving  U.S military unit in a single day's engagement ever. The unit's colors are displayed in the rotunda of the Minnesota Capitol for public appreciation.

Minnesota has two monuments at the Gettysburg National Military Park. The more grand of the two bears the inscription:

In his official report, Confederate Brigadier General Cadmus M. Wilcox perceived the inequality of the fight differently (bold emphasis likely refers to the First Minnesota):
 
This stronghold of the enemy [i.e., Cemetery Ridge], together with his batteries, were almost won, when still another line of infantry descended the slope in our front at a double-quick, to the support of their fleeing comrades and for the defense of the batteries. Seeing this contest so unequal, I dispatched my adjutant-general to the division commander, to ask that support be sent to my men, but no support came. Three several times did this last of the enemy's lines attempt to drive my men back, and were as often repulsed. This struggle at the foot of the hill on which were the enemy's batteries, though so unequal, was continued for some thirty minutes. With a second supporting line, the heights could have been carried. Without support on either my right or left, my men were withdrawn, to prevent their entire destruction or capture. The enemy did not pursue, but my men retired under a heavy artillery fire, and returned to their original position in line, and bivouacked for the night, pickets being left on the pike.

July 3

Carrying on from the heavy losses of the previous day, the remaining men of the 1st Minn. were reinforced by detached Companies F and L. The reunited regiment was moved a bit north of the previous day's fight to one of the few places where Union lines were breached during Pickett's Charge. They again had to charge into advancing Confederate troops with more losses.  Capt. Messick was killed and Capt. W. B. Farrell mortally wounded, and Capt. Henry C. Coates had to take command. During this charge, Private Marshall Sherman of Company C captured the colors of the 28th Virginia Infantry and received the Medal of Honor for this exploit. The Confederate flag was taken back to Minnesota as a war trophy, where it remains. 

After being knocked out by a bullet to the head and later shot in the hand, Corporal Henry D. O'Brien repeatedly picked up the fallen colors of the 1st Minnesota and carried a wounded comrade back to the Union lines. He was also awarded the Medal of Honor for his heroism.

Later service

The 1st Minnesota continued to serve in the Army of the Potomac, participating later in 1863 in the Bristoe and Mine Run Campaigns. It was mustered out of service upon completion of its enlistment on April 29, 1864, at Fort Snelling. Enough of the regiment's veterans reenlisted to form the nucleus of the 1st Minnesota Volunteer Infantry Battalion, which returned to Virginia and served through the end of the war. Others volunteered to serve in the 1st Minnesota Heavy Artillery Regiment including Colonel Colville.

Casualties

The 1st Minnesota Infantry suffered the loss of 10 officers and 177 enlisted men killed in action or who later died of their wounds, plus another 2 officers and 97 enlisted men who died of disease, for a total of 286 fatalities and 609 wounded.

Bull Run

Antietam

Gettysburg

Bristow

Petersburg

Continued lineage
The 2nd Battalion, 135th Infantry Regiment, 34th Infantry Division (Minnesota Army National Guard) traces its roots back to the historic 1st Minnesota Volunteers.

See also
List of Minnesota Civil War Units
28th Virginia Colors

Notes

Bibliography

References

Further reading
 Imholte, John Q., The First Volunteers:  History of the first Minnesota Volunteer Regiment, 1861-1865. Minneapolis: Ross & Haines, 1963. Out of print.
 Moe, Richard, The Last Full Measure: The Life and Death of the First Minnesota Volunteers. St. Paul, MN: Minnesota Historical Society Press, 1993, .

External links
Roster of the First Minnesota
Poem: The Charge of the First Minnesota
Lieutenant William Lochren's account of the First Minnesota at Gettysburg, read January 14, 1890.
Leehan, Brian.  Pale Horse at Plum Run: The First Minnesota at Gettysburg
1st Minnesota Regiment Monument at Gettysburg 
National Guard Heritage Series Painting of the First Minnesota at Gettysburg.
Manuscript collections about the First Minnesota are available for research use at the Minnesota Historical Society
First Minnesota, Co D ~ Lincoln Guards living history organization
Photo of the Day: 1st Minnesota Monument at Gettysburg
From the Journal of Sgt. Sam Bloomer, 1st Minnesota Volunteer Infantry April 29 - May 3, 1861
From the Journal of Sgt. Sam Bloomer, 1st Minnesota Volunteer Infantry Company B, Dec. 24, 1861-Jan. 9, 1862
 The bridge that saved an Army: Grapevine Bridge and the Battle of Fair Oaks
 The First Minnesota in MNopedia
 Minnesota Historical Society resources on Minnesota and the Civil War
 
 Hush - What Was the Civil War Really About - A documentary about the 1st Minnesota Volunteer Infantry and the Civil War
http://sbv.hatinh.gov.vn/upload/tailieu/thuoc-chong-tram-cam-52-16280737159.htm
http://pyttkvtphcm.gov.vn/question/thuoc-chong-tram-cam-va-luu-y-khi-dung/

Units and formations of the Union Army from Minnesota
1861 establishments in Minnesota
Military units and formations established in 1861
Military units and formations disestablished in 1864